Meadow Gold Dairies may refer to:

Meadow Gold Dairies (Hawaii), a historic dairy business in Hawaii
A division of Dean Foods